Sheba Deireragea (born 28 May 1986) is a Nauruan weightlifter. In 2006 her mother Marjorie was listed as her influence and weightlifter Marcus Stephen as her "sports idol." Sheba Deireragea won three bronze medals for Nauru at the 2002 Commonwealth Games and also won a silver medal for Nauru at the 2006 Commonwealth Games.

References 

1986 births
Living people
Commonwealth Games silver medallists for Nauru
Weightlifters at the 2002 Commonwealth Games
Weightlifters at the 2006 Commonwealth Games
Nauruan female weightlifters
Commonwealth Games medallists in weightlifting
Medallists at the 2002 Commonwealth Games
Medallists at the 2006 Commonwealth Games